Three disciplines of cycling were contested at the 2015 European Games: road cycling, mountain biking, and bicycle motocross (BMX). A total of eight medal events were held.

Qualification

Medal summary

Road cycling

Mountain biking

BMX

Medal table

Courses

References

 
Sports at the 2015 European Games
2015
European Games
Cycle races in Azerbaijan
European Games
European Games
European Games